George Bernard Keezell (July 20, 1854 – June 22, 1931) was an American Democratic politician who served as a member of the Virginia Senate and Virginia House of Delegates, representing his native Rockingham County. He initially ran for state senate in 1883, losing to Republican Joseph B. Webb, however he successfully challenged the results of the election and was seated in January 1884. He also represented Rockingham County at the Virginia Constitutional Convention of 1902.

References

External links
 
 

1854 births
1931 deaths
Democratic Party members of the Virginia House of Delegates
People from Rockingham County, Virginia
Democratic Party Virginia state senators
19th-century American politicians
20th-century American politicians